Choman District is a district in Erbil Province, Iraq. Its administrative centre is also called Choman. The District of Choman lies at the Iraqi-Iranian border, and is composed of four Sub-Districts Galala, Haji Omeran, Samilan and Qasre and about 166 villages.

External links 
 District Of Choman

References

Districts of Erbil Governorate